Live at Carnegie Hall 1963 is a six-song live set by Bob Dylan. It was released as an EP by Columbia Records in 2005. The songs were recorded on October 26, 1963 at Carnegie Hall in New York City.

Track listing
All songs written by Bob Dylan.

Four other songs from this night's show (and not present here) have been released on previous Bob Dylan compilations: "Talkin' John Birch Paranoid Blues" and "Who Killed Davey Moore?" were originally released on The Bootleg Series Volumes 1–3 (Rare & Unreleased) 1961–1991, while "A Hard Rain's A-Gonna Fall" and "When the Ship Comes In" were released on The Bootleg Series Vol. 7: No Direction Home: The Soundtrack.

The remaining nine songs performed at the concert were issued in 2013 on the European limited vinyl release The 50th Anniversary Collection 1963, released by Columbia Records in order to prevent a number of Dylan recordings legally entering the public domain in Europe. These nine songs are: "Blowin' in the Wind", 
"Percy's Song", "Seven Curses", "Walls of Red Wing", "Talkin' World War III Blues", "Don't Think Twice, It's All Right", "Only a Pawn in Their Game", "Masters of War" and "The Lonesome Death of Hattie Carroll".

References

2005 EPs
2005 live albums
Albums recorded at Carnegie Hall
Bob Dylan live albums
Columbia Records EPs
Columbia Records live albums
Live EPs